Nazim Uddin Ahmedis a Bangladesh Awami League politician and the incumbent member of parliament for Mymensingh-3.

Career
Ahmed was elected to Parliament from Mymensingh-3 as a Bangladesh Awami League candidate in 2016 in a by-election following the death of the former member of parliament, Mozibur Rahman Fakir. Gouripur Upazila Chairman and Bangladesh Nationalist Party politician Tayebur Rahman Hiron was arrested by Detective Branch according to his family after an argument with Ahmed on 16 February 2017.

References

Awami League politicians
Living people
10th Jatiya Sangsad members
11th Jatiya Sangsad members
1950 births